Live Legacy is a live album by Swedish black metal band Dissection, released in 2003 by Nuclear Blast. It was recorded during a show at the Wacken Open Air festival in Germany on 8 August 1997. It was first released as a bootleg called Frozen in Wacken, which featured the art of romantic painter Antoine Wiertz on the cover. The bootleg also includes the song "Night's Blood" that was omitted from the official release due to errors in the recording.

The Limited Boxset (1,000 pieces) also contains the "Gods of Darkness – Live" DVD and CD is taken from the Dimmu Borgir/Dissection video "Live &
Plugged Vol. 2" as well as a "Live Legacy" poster flag.

Track listing

Frozen in Wacken track listing

Credits 
 Jon Nödtveidt – vocals, guitar
 Johan Norman – guitar
 Emil Nödtveidt – bass
 Tobias Kellgren – drums

References

Dissection (band) live albums
Albums with cover art by Kristian Wåhlin
2003 live albums
Bootleg recordings
Live video albums
2003 video albums